Stony River may refer to the following:

Rivers:
Stony River (Alaska), USA
Stony River (Minnesota), USA
Stony River (West Virginia), USA
Stony River (Jamaica)
Stony River (Canterbury), in the South Island of New Zealand
Stony or Hangatahua River, Taranaki, New Zealand
Stony or Te Wharau River, in the South Island of New Zealand

Places:
Stony River, Alaska, a census-designated place
Stony River Township, Minnesota, a township

See also
Stones River (disambiguation)